Williams Enrique Reyes Rodríguez (born October 30, 1976 in La Ceiba, Honduras) is a Honduran-born Salvadoran professional forward.

Club career
Reyes started his professional career at Deportes Savio, but in 2000, crossed the Salvadoran border to play for Dragón.

After only a year he moved on to FAS, with whom he would win 5 national league titles.

In 2005, he joined Isidro Metapán to win three titles more, only to rejoin FAS in 2009 and add another championship.

In January 2014, Reyes left FAS to rejoin Dragón, but he switched allegiance and joined local rival Águila for the 2015 Clausura season.

International career
Reyes played once for his native Honduras against a Hong Kong League XI during the 2004 Carlsberg Cup but never played in any official FIFA acknowledged match for them.

In fact, he made his debut for El Salvador in a June 2008 FIFA World Cup qualification match against Panama and has earned a total of 17 caps, scoring no goals.

He has represented his adopted country in 10 FIFA World Cup qualification matches and played at the 2009 CONCACAF Gold Cup.

His final international game was an October 2009 FIFA World Cup qualification match against Honduras.

Honours

Clubs

FAS
Primera Division:
Winner (6): Clausura 2002, Apertura 2002, Apertura 2003, Apertura 2004, Clausura 2005, Apertura 2009

Isidro Metapán
Primera División:
Winner (3): Clausura 2007, Apertura 2008, Clausura 2009

Individual
Salvadoran Primera División Top Scorer (6): Apertura 2000 (17), Clausura 2004 (14), Apertura 2007 (11), Clausura 2008 (14), Apertura 2009 (11), and Clausura 2014 (13)

References

External links
 
 Profile - CD FAS
 Interview with William Reyes 

1976 births
Living people
People from La Ceiba
Honduran emigrants to El Salvador
Naturalized citizens of El Salvador
Association football forwards
Honduran footballers
Honduran expatriate footballers
Salvadoran footballers
El Salvador international footballers
2009 CONCACAF Gold Cup players
Deportes Savio players
C.D. FAS footballers
A.D. Isidro Metapán footballers
C.D. Águila footballers